This is a list of all personnel changes for the 2012 Indian Premier League.

Retirement

Transfers
The first transfer window was between 15 December and 20 January 2012 and included the following transfers.

New additions

The following players were either retained who played for the team last year as a replacement or a local Indian player who is selected to play for them without going into the auction.

Players bought out

The following players were left out by their teams who were actually bought in the auction, or bought from Indian domestic circuit or played for a particular team for 1 season as a replacement player.

Withdrawn players
The following players withdrew from the tournament either due to injuries or because of other reasons.

Replacement signings
Players were signed as replacement of contracted players who were not available to play due to injuries and national commitments. Under IPL rules, the replacements have to be chosen from the pool of players who went unsold in the auction, and cannot be paid more than the players they are replacing, though they can be paid less.

Auction
The players auction for the 2012 Indian Premier League (fifth season) was held on 4 February 2012 in Bangalore. Each player in the auction pool had a base price under which franchise owners cannot bid. Players were allowed to set their base price between $20,000 to $400,000. The auction was telecast live on SET Max, the official broadcaster of IPL.

IPL authority increased the number of players in each squad to 33 from the previous limit of 30 and also increased the salary cap by $2 million. Each team can have a maximum of 11 overseas players in their squad and they can spend up to $2 million at auction.

The players of Kochi Tuskers Kerala were included in the players auction. Kochi was terminated by the BCCI in September 2011.

Sold players
The list of players sold at 2012 IPL player auction. Pune Warriors India did not take part.

Players list

First tier ($400,000):

  Graeme Swann
  VVS Laxman
  Sreesanth
  Brendon McCullum

Second tier ($300,000):

  Alastair Cook
  Mitchell Johnson
  James Anderson
  Mahela Jayawardene

Third tier ($200,000):

  Brad Hodge
  Peter Siddle
  Steve Smith
  Ian Bell
  Owais Shah
  Matt Prior
  Chris Tremlett
  Luke Wright
  Rikki Clarke
  RP Singh
  Parthiv Patel
  Vernon Philander
  Nicky Boje
  Muttiah Muralitharan

Fourth tier ($100,000):
Capped:

  Brad Hogg
  Stuart MacGill
  Xavier Doherty
  Adam Voges
  Stephen O'Keefe
  Azhar Mahmood
  Jade Dernbach
  Ravi Bopara
  Simon Jones
  Ravindra Jadeja
  Vinay Kumar
  Ramesh Powar
  VRV Singh
  Jacob Oram
  Tim Southee
  Kyle Mills
  Mark Boucher
  Justin Kemp
  Neil McKenzie
  Robin Peterson
  Alviro Petersen
  Morne van Wyk
  Ryan McLaen
  Imran Tahir
  Dilhara Fernando
  Ramnaresh Sarwan
  Marlon Samuels
  Denesh Ramdin
  Dwayne Smith
  Ravi Rampaul
  Fidel Edwards
  Daren Ganga
  Darren Bravo
  Brendan Taylor
  Raymond Price

Uncapped:

  Ben Cutting
  James Faulkner
  Tom Maynard

Fifth tier ($50,000):
Capped:

  Jason Krejza
  Ben Laughlin
  Luke Ronchi
  Shane Harwood
  Usman Khawaja
  Tamim Iqbal
  Mal Loye
  Lou Vincent
  Ian Butler
  Andy McKay
  Rob Nicol
  Doug Bracewell
  Herschelle Gibbs
  Lonwabo Tsotsobe
  Rory Kleinveldt
  Marchant de Lange
  Upul Tharanga
  Farveez Maharoof
  Chamara Kapugedera
  Ajantha Mendis
  Thisara Perera
  Dinesh Chandimal
  Rangana Herath
  Chanaka Welegedara
  Lendl Simmons
  Sulieman Benn
  Andre Russell
  Devendra Bishoo
  Adrian Barath
  Sunil Narine
  Hamilton Masakadza
  Charles Coventry
  Prosper Utseya

Uncapped:

  Cameron Borgas
  Lee Carseldine
  Ben Edmondson
  Peter Forrest
  Daniel Harris
  Michael Klinger
  Michael Neser
  Jason Roy
  Tom Cooper
  Kevin O’Brien
  Niall O’Brien
  Johan van der Wath
  Ahmed Amla
  Dillon du Preez
  Robert Frylinck
  Richard Levi
  Kevon Cooper

Sixth tier ($20,000):
Capped:

  Josh Hazlewood
  Trent Copeland
  Adam Milne
  Jacques Rudolph
  Paul Harris
  Gulam Bodi
  Vaughn van Jaarsveld
  Andrew Puttick
  Thilina Kandamby
  Thilan Thushara
  Jeevan Mendis
  Dilruwan Perera
  Lahiru Thirimanne
  Kosala Kulasekara
  Nuwan Pradeep
  Andre Fletcher
  Krishmar Santokie
  Keegan Meth
  Tino Mawoyo

Uncapped:

  Tim Cruickshank
  Aaron Heal
  Ashton May
  Alister McDermott
  Aaron O’Brien
  Ben Rohrer
  Daniel Smith
  Farhaan Behardien
  Henry Davids
  CJ de Villiers
  Daryn Smit
  JJ Smuts
  Craig Thyssen
  Sachithra Senanayake
  Samuel Badree
  Jonathan Carter

References

Indian Premier League personnel changes
Personnel changes